Michel van der Horst (born 8 April 1975) is a Dutch professional darts player who currently playing in British Darts Organisation events.

Career
Van der Horst qualified for the 2015 BDO World Championship and played David Cameron of Canada in the preliminary round winning 3–2 in sets, but was beaten 3–1 by Jamie Hughes in the first round. He qualified for the 2015 Grand Slam of Darts, but lost each of his games against James Wade, Keegan Brown and Mark Webster to finish bottom of Group F.

Van der Horst switched to the PDC in 2016 and played in his first European Tour event at the European Darts Matchplay and recovered from 4–1 down to Rowby-John Rodriguez in the first round to level at 4–4, but was beaten 6–4.

World Championship results

BDO
 2015: First round (lost to Jamie Hughes 1–3)

External links
Michel van der Horst's profile and stats on Darts Database

References

1975 births
Living people
Dutch darts players
British Darts Organisation players
Sportspeople from Deventer
20th-century Dutch people